Tonet is an unincorporated community in the towns of Red River and Luxemburg, Kewaunee County, Wisconsin, United States.

History
The community started as the neighboring community later to be called Champion grew. When the original log church of St. Joseph at Champion was destroyed by fire in 1874, a dispute then arose between the Flemish and the Walloon Belgians, as to where to rebuild the church.
As a result of the disagreement, the Flemish Belgians built their own church on the site of St. Martin Catholic Church, Tonet. 

Initally when it was established as a community, the place was known as Martinsville, after St. Martin's church.

The proposed post office in 1887 was supposed to be Jonet, after Peter Jonet the first postmaster. However the clerk in charge of postmaster appointments department mistook the J for a T.

References

Unincorporated communities in Wisconsin
Unincorporated communities in Kewaunee County, Wisconsin